The 2022 U.S. Virgin Islands gubernatorial election took place on November 8, 2022 to elect the Governor of the United States Virgin Islands. The election was held concurrently with the 2022 United States midterm elections.

Incumbent Democratic Governor Albert Bryan was elected to a second four-year term in office, receiving 56% of the vote. He ran against Independent candidate and territorial senator Kurt Vialet, independent activist Ronald Pickard, and former ICM senator Stephen Frett.

Democratic primary 
 Registered voters: 34,697 
 Turnout: 20.36%
 Voting Centers: St. Croix - D.C. Canegata Recreation Center, Arthur A. Richards K-8 School Modular Cafeteria, St. Croix Central High School Gymnasium ; St. Thomas - Tutu Park Mall (former Scotiabank location), CAHS Gymnasium, UVI Sports and Fitness Center ; St. John - Calabash Boom Community Center 

The 2022 Democratic gubernatorial primary was held on August 6, 2022. Incumbents Governor Albert Bryan and Lt. Governor Tregenza Roach were challenged by  Kent Bernier Sr. and his running mate, Oakland Benta. Early voting began July 18 until August 1, 2022. The first set of results came in at 8:45pm showing a close race between Bryan (566 votes) and Bernier (469 votes). Later into the night, Bryan commanded his lead with 3,270 votes compare to Bernier with 1,831 votes as early voting ballots were counted. Following a delay of votes at two voting sites on St. Thomas. Unofficial results indicate Bryan with 4,016 votes won the nomination over Bernier who received 2,146 votes.

Endorsements

Polling

Results

General election 
The gubernatorial general election was held on November 8, 2022, with incumbent Governor Albert Bryan facing three candidates which were St. Croix Senator Kurt Vialet, former police officer Ronald Pickard and former Senator Stephen Frett. Early voting started October 10 through October 31, 2022.

 Voting Centers: St. Croix - D.C. Canegata Recreation Center, St. Dunstan’s Episcopal School auditorium, St. Croix Central High School Modular Gymnasium, St. Croix Educational Complex Gymnasium, and Arthur A. Richards K-8 School Modular Cafeteria ; St. Thomas - Tutu Park Mall (former Scotiabank location), CAHS Gymnasium, UVI Sports and Fitness Center, Ivanna Eudora Kean High School Cafeteria ; St. John - Julius E. Sprauve School Cafeteria, Calabash Boom Community Center.

Endorsements

Polling

 USVI Public Schools Mock Election Results

Results

References

Gubernatorial
United States Virgin Islands